East Rutherford is a borough in Bergen County, in the U.S. state of New Jersey. As of the 2020 United States census, the borough's population was 10,022, an increase of 1,109 (+12.4%) from the 2010 census count of 8,913, which in turn reflected an increase of 197 (+2.3%) from the 8,716 counted in the 2000 census.

Under the terms of an act of the New Jersey Legislature on April 17, 1889, a portion of the old Union Township was incorporated under the name of Boiling Springs Township. The new township took its name from a spring in the community. On March 28, 1894, the Borough of East Rutherford was created, based on the results of a referendum held the previous day, and Boiling Springs Township was dissolved. While there was no change in its borders, the name and form of government were changed.  The borough was the second formed during the "Boroughitis" phenomenon then sweeping through Bergen County, in which 26 boroughs were formed in the county in 1894 alone.

East Rutherford is the home of the Meadowlands Sports Complex, which includes Meadowlands Arena and MetLife Stadium, and used to be the location of Giants Stadium. The arena was best known as the former home of the New Jersey Devils of the National Hockey League and of the New Jersey Nets of the National Basketball Association, and for hosting college basketball, arena football, concerts, and other events. MetLife Stadium is home of the New York Giants and New York Jets of the National Football League (NFL), the New York Guardians of the XFL, and hosted Super Bowl XLVIII, which made East Rutherford the smallest city ever to host a Super Bowl. East Rutherford will be one of 16 venues chosen to host games for the 2026 FIFA World Cup, with matches being played at MetLife Stadium. Giants Stadium, which hosted the Giants and Jets until 2009, was also the original home of the New York Red Bulls of Major League Soccer. East Rutherford is the only municipality with fewer than 10,000 residents to have been home to five professional sports teams simultaneously, as well as the smallest city to host any professional sports team within its city limits.

The borough is also the site of American Dream Meadowlands, a large shopping center and entertainment complex that was originally named "Xanadu" which opened on October 25, 2019.

Geography
According to the U.S. Census Bureau, the borough had a total area of 4.04 square miles (10.47 km2), including 3.71 square miles (9.61 km2) of land and 0.33 square miles (0.85 km2) of water (8.14%).

East Rutherford is bounded on the north by the boroughs of Carlstadt and Wallington and to the south by the borough of Rutherford in Bergen County; by Secaucus in Hudson County; and by Passaic in Passaic County. The Passaic River is the western boundary, and the Hackensack River is the eastern boundary. The area in which East Rutherford is located is the valley of the Passaic and Hackensack rivers.

Carlton Hill is an unincorporated community located within the township.

Demographics

2010 census

The Census Bureau's 2006–2010 American Community Survey showed that (in 2010 inflation-adjusted dollars) median household income was $62,471 (with a margin of error of +/− $8,225) and the median family income was $71,357 (+/− $10,225). Males had a median income of $57,511 (+/− $8,669) versus $48,502 (+/− $2,269) for females. The per capita income for the borough was $32,467 (+/− $2,752). About 5.9% of families and 6.5% of the population were below the poverty line, including 4.2% of those under age 18 and 13.4% of those age 65 or over.

Same-sex couples headed 19 households in 2010, a decline from the 27 counted in 2000.

2000 census
As of the 2000 United States census, there were 8,716 people, 3,644 households, and 2,157 families residing in the borough. The population density was 2,289.1 people per square mile (883.3/km2). There were 3,771 housing units at an average density of 990.4 per square mile (382.1/km2). The racial makeup of the borough was 79.68% White, 3.72% African American, 0.11% Native American, 10.69% Asian, 0.05% Pacific Islander, 3.21% from other races, and 2.54% from two or more races. Hispanic or Latino of any race were 10.65% of the population.

There were 3,644 households, out of which 25.2% had children under the age of 18 living with them, 44.4% were married couples living together, 10.8% had a female householder with no husband present, and 40.8% were non-families. 33.4% of all households were made up of individuals, and 11.6% had someone living alone who was 65 years of age or older. The average household size was 2.35 and the average family size was 3.05.

In the borough, the age distribution of the population shows 19.4% under the age of 18, 7.1% from 18 to 24, 36.5% from 25 to 44, 22.7% from 45 to 64, and 14.3% who were 65 years of age or older. The median age was 38 years. For every 100 females, there were 94.8 males. For every 100 females age 18 and over, there were 93.8 males. The median income for a household in the borough was $50,163, and the median income for a family was $59,583. Males had a median income of $40,798 versus $36,047 for females. The per capita income for the borough was $28,072. About 7.4% of families and 9.6% of the population were below the poverty line, including 10.1% of those under age 18 and 11.6% of those age 65 or over.

Economy
East Rutherford is home to the Hudson Group, a retailer which operates a chain of newsstands, bookstores, fast food restaurants, and other retail stores chiefly at airports and train stations. Contract manufacturing organization Cambrex Corporation is based in East Rutherford.

The East Rutherford Operations Center handles currency in the area covered by the Federal Reserve Bank of New York, a task that includes removing and destroying 5 million currency notes every day.

The Dawn Bible Students Association moved to East Rutherford in 1944. The organization has a worldwide outreach and publishes many Bible-based books as well as The Dawn magazine.

Government

Local government
East Rutherford is governed under the Borough form of New Jersey municipal government, which is used in 218 municipalities (of the 564) statewide, making it the most common form of government in New Jersey. The governing body is comprised of a Mayor and a Borough Council, with all positions elected at-large on a partisan basis as part of the November general election. A Mayor is elected directly by the voters to a four-year term of office. The Borough Council is comprised of six members elected to serve three-year terms on a staggered basis, with two seats coming up for election each year in a three-year cycle. The Borough form of government used by East Rutherford is a "weak mayor / strong council" government in which council members act as the legislative body with the mayor presiding at meetings and voting only in the event of a tie. The mayor can veto ordinances subject to an override by a two-thirds majority vote of the council. The mayor makes committee and liaison assignments for council members, and most appointments are made by the mayor with the advice and consent of the council.

, East Rutherford's Mayor is Democrat Jeffrey Lahullier, whose term of office ends December 31, 2023. The borough council members are Council President George W. Cronk (D, 2025), Daniel Alvarez Jr. (D, 2024), Jason Bulger (D, 2025), Michael C. Lorusso (D, 2024), Edward C. Ravettine (D, 2023), and Saverio "Sam" Stallone (D, 2023).

Federal, state and county representation
East Rutherford is located in the 9th Congressional District and is part of New Jersey's 36th state legislative district.

Politics
As of March 2011, there were a total of 4,484 registered voters in East Rutherford, of which 1,233 (27.5% vs. 31.7% countywide) were registered as Democrats, 1,190 (26.5% vs. 21.1%) were registered as Republicans and 2,058 (45.9% vs. 47.1%) were registered as Unaffiliated. There were 3 voters registered as Libertarians or Greens. Among the borough's 2010 Census population, 50.3% (vs. 57.1% in Bergen County) were registered to vote, including 61.5% of those ages 18 and over (vs. 73.7% countywide).

In the 2016 presidential election, Democrat Hillary Clinton received 1,918 votes (50.1% vs. 54.2% countywide), ahead of Republican Donald Trump with 1,740 votes (45.5% vs. 41.1% countywide) and other candidates with 169 votes (4.4% vs. 4.6% countywide), among the 3,871 ballots cast by the borough's 5,380 registered voters for a turnout of 71.9% (vs. 72.5% in Bergen County). In the 2012 presidential election, Democrat Barack Obama received 1,859 votes (59.7% vs. 54.8% countywide), ahead of Republican Mitt Romney with 1,340 votes (43.0% vs. 43.5%) and other candidates with 48 votes (1.5% vs. 0.9%), among the 3,115 ballots cast by the borough's 4,845 registered voters, for a turnout of 64.3% (vs. 70.4% in Bergen County). In the 2008 presidential election, Democrat Barack Obama received 1,888 votes (51.8% vs. 53.9% countywide), ahead of Republican John McCain with 1,660 votes (45.5% vs. 44.5%) and other candidates with 54 votes (1.5% vs. 0.8%), among the 3,647 ballots cast by the borough's 4,911 registered voters, for a turnout of 74.3% (vs. 76.8% in Bergen County). In the 2004 presidential election, Democrat John Kerry received 1,641 votes (49.6% vs. 51.7% countywide), ahead of Republican George W. Bush with 1,613 votes (48.7% vs. 47.2%) and other candidates with 30 votes (0.9% vs. 0.7%), among the 3,309 ballots cast by the borough's 4,634 registered voters, for a turnout of 71.4% (vs. 76.9% in the whole county).

In the 2013 gubernatorial election, Republican Chris Christie received 59.4% of the vote (1,205 cast), ahead of Democrat Barbara Buono with 38.7% (785 votes), and other candidates with 1.8% (37 votes), among the 2,111 ballots cast by the borough's 4,596 registered voters (84 ballots were spoiled), for a turnout of 45.9%. In the 2009 gubernatorial election, Republican Chris Christie received 1,004 votes (48.2% vs. 45.8% countywide), ahead of Democrat Jon Corzine with 919 votes (44.1% vs. 48.0%), Independent Chris Daggett with 112 votes (5.4% vs. 4.7%) and other candidates with 17 votes (0.8% vs. 0.5%), among the 2,082 ballots cast by the borough's 4,709 registered voters, yielding a 44.2% turnout (vs. 50.0% in the county).

Education
Public school students in kindergarten through eighth grade attend the East Rutherford School District. As of the 2018–19 school year, the district, comprised of two schools, had an enrollment of 819 students and 73.2 classroom teachers (on an FTE basis), for a student–teacher ratio of 11.2:1. Schools in the district (with 2018–19 enrollment data from the National Center for Education Statistics) are 
McKenzie School with 454 students in grades Pre-K–5 and 
Alfred S. Faust School with 345 students in grades 6–8.

For grades ninth through twelfth grades, public school students attend the Henry P. Becton Regional High School in East Rutherford, which serves high school students from both Carlstadt and East Rutherford. The school is part of the Carlstadt-East Rutherford Regional School District. As of the 2018–19 school year, the high school had an enrollment of 491 students and 37.2 classroom teachers (on an FTE basis), for a student–teacher ratio of 13.2:1. Seats on the high school district's nine-member board of education are allocated based on the population of the constituent municipalities, with five seats allocated to East Rutherford. Starting in the 2020–2021 school year, students from Maywood will start attending the school as part of a sending/receiving relationship; Maywood's transition to Becton will be complete after the final group of twelfth graders graduates from Hackensack High School at the end of the 2023–2024 school year.

Public school students from the borough, and all of Bergen County, are eligible to attend the secondary education programs offered by the Bergen County Technical Schools, which include the Bergen County Academies in Hackensack, and the Bergen Tech campus in Teterboro or Paramus. The district offers programs on a shared-time or full-time basis, with admission based on a selective application process and tuition covered by the student's home school district.

Emergency services

Police
The East Rutherford Police Department provides emergency and protective services to the borough of East Rutherford.

It consists of a Patrol Division, Detective Bureau, Traffic Division, Juvenile Division, and Records Bureau.

The Chief of Police is Dennis M. Rivelli.

Fire
The East Rutherford Fire Department (ERFD) is an all-volunteer fire department. The ERFD was organized in 1894 and consists of a chief and three assistant chiefs. There are three fire stations. The department is staffed by eighty fully trained firefighters. The ERFD utilizes two Engines, a Ladder truck, a Heavy Rescue, and a Quint. The ERFD also provides emergency medical service to the borough.

Engine 1 2008 Sutphen 1750/750/20F 
Engine 2 2008 Sutphen 1750/750/20F 
Engine 3 2008 Sutphen 2000/500/75' Midmount Quint  
Ladder 1 2008 Sutphen 2000/300/100' Aerial Tower
Rescue 4 2010 International/Sutphen 500/300/20F

Transportation

Roads and highways

State Routes include Route 17, Route 120 and Route 3. The only interstate that passes through and serves East Rutherford is Interstate 95 (the New Jersey Turnpike Western Spur) at Exit 16W.

Public transportation
Rutherford station, which is located on the Rutherford – East Rutherford border, provides train service on NJ Transit's Bergen County Line. The Meadowlands station offers service on the Meadowlands Rail Line, which began in June 2009, providing access between the Meadowlands Sports Complex and Secaucus Junction, and from there to other NJ Transit lines with trains operating before and after games and other events at the complex.

NJ Transit buses include the 160, 163, 164 and 322 routes serving the Port Authority Bus Terminal in Midtown Manhattan; the 76 to Newark; and local service on the 703 route.

Notable people

People who were born in, residents of, or otherwise closely associated with East Rutherford include:
 Carol Arthur (1935–2020), actress, mainly recognizable as playing supporting roles in films produced by Mel Brooks
 E. J. Barthel (born 1985), fullback who played for the Las Vegas Locomotives of the United Football League
 Ernest Cuneo (1905–1988), lawyer, newspaperman, author and intelligence liaison, who played two seasons in the NFL for the Orange Tornadoes and the Brooklyn Dodgers
 Fireman Ed (born 1959, nickname of Edwin M. Anzalone), superfan of the New York Jets
 Alfred Byrd Graf (1901–2001), botanist known for his richly illustrated books on the subject of plants
 Henry Helstoski (1925–1999), represented , served as councilman of East Rutherford in 1956 and as mayor from 1957 to 1965
 Harold C. Hollenbeck (born 1938), politician who represented New Jersey in the United States House of Representatives from 1977 to 1983
 Henry Hook (1955–2015), crossword creator
 Bobby Jones (born 1972), former pitcher who played for the New York Mets
 Martin Kilson (1931–2019), political scientist who was the first black academic to be appointed a full professor at Harvard University
 Jim Powers (born 1958), retired professional wrestler best known for his appearances with the World Wrestling Federation from 1987 to 1994
 Diane Ruggiero, screenwriter for Veronica Mars
 Patty Shwartz (born 1961), is a United States Circuit Judge of United States Court of Appeals for the Third Circuit
 Dick Vitale (born 1939), sports broadcaster who attended high school and coached at his alma mater, East Rutherford High School; inducted into the East Rutherford Hall of Fame in 1985

References

Sources

 Municipal Incorporations of the State of New Jersey (according to Counties) prepared by the Division of Local Government, Department of the Treasury (New Jersey); December 1, 1958
 Clayton, W. Woodford; and Nelson, Nelson. History of Bergen and Passaic Counties, New Jersey, with Biographical Sketches of Many of its Pioneers and Prominent Men. Philadelphia: Everts and Peck, 1882.
 Harvey, Cornelius Burnham (ed.), Genealogical History of Hudson and Bergen Counties, New Jersey. New York: New Jersey Genealogical Publishing Co., 1900.
 Van Valen, James M. History of Bergen County, New Jersey. New York: New Jersey Publishing and Engraving Co., 1900.
 Westervelt, Frances A. (Frances Augusta), 1858–1942, History of Bergen County, New Jersey, 1630–1923, Lewis Historical Publishing Company, 1923.

External links

 East Rutherford official website
 East Rutherford Historical Society
 Meadowlands Regional Chamber of Commerce
 Meadowlands Liberty Convention & Visitors Bureau

 
1889 establishments in New Jersey
Borough form of New Jersey government
Boroughs in Bergen County, New Jersey
New Jersey Meadowlands District
Populated places established in 1889